is a New York City based Japanese saxophonist. She is a member of Pet Bottle Ningen, and has also played with Ron Anderson's PAK and Yoshida Tatsuya. She has also worked with John Zorn. Her solo work in 2015 was received well.

Discography
 Lotus

with Pet Bottle Ningen
 Pet Bottle Ningen
 Non-Recyclable

with PAK
 NYJPN (with Tatsuya Yoshida)

with Eighty-pound Pug
 speechless

other collaboration
 DEN SVARTA FANAN [JOE MEROLLA/RON ANDERSON/NONOKO YOSHIDA/WEASEL WALTER]

References

External links 

 

Japanese saxophonists
Living people
Japanese expatriates in the United States
21st-century saxophonists
Year of birth missing (living people)
Women saxophonists